Sound eXchange (SoX) is a cross-platform audio editing software. It has a command-line interface, and is written in standard C. It is free software, licensed under GPL-2.0-or-later, with libsox licensed under LGPL-2.1-or-later, and distributed by Chris Bagwell through SourceForge.

History
SoX was created in July 1991 by Lance Norskog and posted to the Usenet group alt.sources as Aural eXchange: Sound sample translator. With the second release (in November the same year) it was renamed Sound Exchange. Norskog continued to maintain and release SoX via Usenet, File Transfer Protocol (FTP), and then the web until early 1995, at which time SoX was at version 11 (gamma). In May 1996, Chris Bagwell started to maintain and release updated versions of SoX, starting with version sox-11gamma-cb. In September 2000, Bagwell registered the project at SourceForge with project name "sox". The registration was announced on 4 September 2000 and SoX 12.17 was released on 7 September 2000.

Throughout its history SoX has had many contributing authors; Guido van Rossum, best known as creator of the programming language Python, was a significant contributor in SoX's early days.

Features

Some of SoX's features are:
 Cross-platform (Windows, Linux, Solaris, OS X, et al.)
 Reading and writing Au, WAV, AIFF, MP3 (via an external LAME MP3 encoder), Ogg Vorbis, FLAC and other audio file formats
 Recording and playing audio (on many systems); playing via URL (internet file or stream)
 Editing via concatenate, trim, pad, repeat, reverse, volume, fade, splice, normalise
 Processing via chorus, flanger, echo, phaser, compressor, delay, filter (high-pass, low-pass, shelving, etc.)
 Adjustment of speed (pitch and tempo), pitch (without tempo), tempo (without pitch), and sample rate
 Noise removal using frequency profiling, implemented since December 2004
 Silent passage removal, implemented since September 2001
 Simple audio synthesis
 Multi-file & multi-track mixing
 Multi-file merging (e.g., 2 mono to 1 stereo)
 Statistical analysis; spectrogram analysis

Examples
SoX being used to process some audio:

<nowiki>
$ sox track1.wav track1-processed.flac remix - norm -3
 highpass 22 gain -3 rate 48k norm -3 dither

Input File     : 'track1.wav'
Channels       : 2
Sample Rate    : 44100
Precision      : 16-bit
Duration       : 00:02:54.97 = 7716324 samples = 13123 CDDA sectors
Sample Encoding: 16-bit Signed Integer PCM
Endian Type    : little

Output File    : 'track1-processed.flac'
Channels       : 1
Sample Rate    : 48000
Precision      : 16-bit
Duration       : 00:02:54.97 = 8398720 samples ~ 13123 CDDA sectors
Sample Encoding: 16-bit FLAC

sox: effects chain: input      44100Hz 2 channels 16 bits (multi)
sox: effects chain: remix      44100Hz 2 channels 16 bits (multi)
sox: effects chain: norm       44100Hz 1 channels 16 bits
sox: effects chain: highpass   44100Hz 1 channels 16 bits
sox: effects chain: gain       44100Hz 1 channels 16 bits (multi)
sox: effects chain: rate       44100Hz 1 channels 16 bits
sox: effects chain: norm       48000Hz 1 channels 16 bits
sox: effects chain: dither     48000Hz 1 channels 16 bits (multi)
sox: effects chain: output     48000Hz 1 channels 16 bits (multi) </nowiki>

Playing some audio files:

<nowiki>
$ play *.ogg

01 - Summer's Cauldron.ogg:

  Encoding: Vorbis
  Channels: 2 @ 16-bit   Track: 01 of 15
Samplerate: 44100Hz      Album: Skylarking
Album gain: -7.8dB      Artist: XTC
  Duration: 00:03:19.99  Title: Summer's Cauldron

In:20.8% 00:00:41.61 [00:02:38.38] Out:1.84M [  ====|====  ]        Clip:0 </nowiki>

Vulnerabilities
SoX has had several vulnerabilities listed in the National Vulnerability Database since its last public release in 2015.  These vulnerabilities include stack and heap overflows and denial-of-service attacks.

See also
 Digital audio
 Audio file format
 Audio signal processing
 Multitrack recording
 Audio mastering
 Sample rate conversion

 Free audio software
 List of Linux audio software

References

External links
 
 NVD entries for SoX

Command-line software
Free audio software
Free audio editors
Free music software
Free software programmed in C
MacOS multimedia software
Digital audio editors for Linux